European Universities Handball Championships were included on the EUSA Sports Program in 2006 and have been organised annually since.

The European Universities Handball Championships are coordinated by the European University Sports Association along with the 18 other sports on the program of the European universities championships.

Overview

External links

References
 

handball
Handball competitions in Europe
Recurring sporting events established in 2006
2006 establishments in Europe